There are over 20,000 Grade II* listed buildings in England. This page is a list of these buildings in the former district of Wellingborough in Northamptonshire, which now forms part of the North Northamptonshire unitary authority.

Wellingborough

|}

Notes

External links

 
Lists of Grade II* listed buildings in Northamptonshire
Wellingborough